Kızılırmak District is a district of the Çankırı Province of Turkey. Its seat is the town of Kızılırmak. Its area is 514 km2, and its population is 7,122 (2021).

Composition
There is one municipality in Kızılırmak District:
 Kızılırmak

There are 26 villages in Kızılırmak District:

 Aşağıalagöz 
 Aşağıovacık 
 Bayanpınar 
 Bostanlı 
 Boyacıoğlu 
 Büyükbahçeli 
 Cacıklar 
 Güneykışla 
 Hacılar 
 Halaçlı 
 Kahyalı 
 Kapaklı 
 Karadibek 
 Karallı 
 Karamürsel 
 Karaömer 
 Kavlaklı 
 Kemallı 
 Korçullu 
 Kuzeykışla
 Sakarca 
 Saraycık 
 Tepealagöz 
 Tımarlı 
 Yeniyapan 
 Yukarıalagöz

References

Districts of Çankırı Province